Little Lava Lake lies in the Cascade Range about  west-southwest of Bend in the U.S. state of Oregon.

Lava Lake, Little Lava Lake, and other nearby lakes formed after lava flows from Mount Bachelor altered drainage patterns in the area. Solidified lava flows are visible along the shorelines of both lakes, and the volcanic peaks Broken Top and South Sister can be seen to the north.

Recreation
Fish in the lake include stocked rainbow trout, wild brook trout, and tui chub. Caught trout average  and sometimes reach . In addition to fishing, the lake is used for canoeing, rafting, and swimming.

The Little Lava Lake campground has 13 campsites, two tent-only sites for large groups, and a boat ramp.

Trails in the area offer opportunities for hiking and horseback riding. One trail follows the west side of Little Lava Lake and leads south into Three Sisters Wilderness and on to Williamson Mountain.

Murders

In January 1924 the triple-murder of fur trappers, Edward Nickols, Roy Wilson, and Dewey Morris, occurred near the lake. Their bodies were discovered in Little Lava Lake in April 1924, where they had been deposited under the surface ice. The murders are unsolved.

See also
 List of lakes in Oregon
 Lava Lake murders

References

External links

Little Lava Lake – Recreation.gov
Little Lava Lake – U.S. Forest Service

Lakes of Oregon
Lakes of Deschutes County, Oregon
Protected areas of Deschutes County, Oregon
Deschutes National Forest
Lava dammed lakes